A reading stone is an approximately hemispherical lens that can be placed on top of text to magnify the letters so that people with presbyopia can read it more easily. Reading stones were among the earliest common uses of lenses.

The invention of reading stones is often credited to Abbas ibn Firnas in the 9th century, although the regular use of reading stones only began around 1000 AD. Early reading stones were manufactured from rock crystal (quartz) or beryl as well as glass, which could be shaped and polished into stones used for viewing. The Swedish Visby lenses, dating from the 11th or 12th century, may have been reading stones.

The function of reading stones was replaced by the use of spectacles from the late 13th century onwards, but modern implementations are still used.  In their modern form, they can be found as rod-shaped magnifiers, flat on one side, that magnify a line of text at a time, or as large dome magnifiers which magnify a circular area of a page. Larger Fresnel lenses can be placed over an entire page. The modern forms are usually made of plastic.

References

Magnifiers
Corrective lenses